4-Hydroxy-tetrahydrodipicolinate synthase (EC 4.3.3.7, dihydrodipicolinate synthase, dihydropicolinate synthetase, dihydrodipicolinic acid synthase, L-aspartate-4-semialdehyde hydro-lyase (adding pyruvate and cyclizing), dapA (gene)) is an enzyme with the systematic name L-aspartate-4-semialdehyde hydro-lyase (adding pyruvate and cyclizing; (4S)-4-hydroxy-2,3,4,5-tetrahydro-(2S)-dipicolinate-forming). This enzyme catalyses the following chemical reaction

 pyruvate + L-aspartate-4-semialdehyde  (2S,4S)-4-hydroxy-2,3,4,5-tetrahydrodipicolinate + H2O

The reaction proceeds in three consecutive steps.

Function 

This enzyme belongs to the family of lyases, specifically the amine-lyases, which cleave carbon-nitrogen bonds. 4-hydroxy-tetrahydrodipicolinate synthase is the key enzyme in lysine biosynthesis via the diaminopimelate pathway of prokaryotes, some phycomycetes, and higher plants. The enzyme catalyses the condensation of L-aspartate-beta-semialdehyde and pyruvate to 4-hydroxy-tetrahydropicolinic acid via a ping-pong mechanism in which pyruvate binds to the enzyme by forming a Schiff base with a lysine residue.

Related enzymes 

Three other proteins are structurally related to this enzyme and probably also act via a similar catalytic mechanism. These are Escherichia coli N-acetylneuraminate lyase (protein NanA), which catalyses the condensation of N-acetyl-D-mannosamine and pyruvate to form N-acetylneuraminate; Rhizobium meliloti (Sinorhizobium meliloti) protein MosA, which is involved in the biosynthesis of the rhizopine 3-O-methyl-scyllo-inosamine; and E. coli hypothetical protein YjhH.

Structure 

The sequences of 4-hydroxy-tetrahydrodipicolinate synthase from different sources are well-conserved. The structure takes the form of a homotetramer, in which 2 monomers are related by an approximate 2-fold symmetry. Each monomer comprises 2 domains: an 8-fold α/β-barrel, and a C-terminal α-helical domain. The fold resembles that of N-acetylneuraminate lyase. The active site lysine is located in the barrel domain, and has access via 2 channels on the C-terminal side of the barrel.

References

Further reading

External links 
 

EC 4.3.3
Enzymes of known structure
Protein domains